Lost Hills Airport , also known as Lost Hills-Kern County Airport, was a public airport located  northeast of the central business district (CBD) of Lost Hills, in Kern County, California, United States. It was mostly used for general aviation. It was closed in March 2019.

Facilities 
Lost Hills Airport covered  and had one runway:

 Runway 15/33: , surface: asphalt

History

The airport was built as the Lost Hills Auxiliary Field or Lost Hills Field No. 7, a satellite airfield of Minter Field, a US Army World War II pilot training base. In 1942 the War Department received the free use of land from Jean Atkinson on November 5, 1942. The US Army added 288.26 acres more of free land, received from Standard Oil Company of California on August 30, 1943. The Army built a 5,000-foot runway and a 1,600-foot clay landing strip at Lost Hills Auxiliary Field. The 5,000-foot runway was used for training bomber pilots like the North American B-25 Mitchell and Lockheed P-38 Lightning. The Vultee BT-13 Valiant and Boeing-Stearman Model 75 were the most common planes used for training at Minter Army Airfield auxiliary fields. Lost Hills Auxiliary Field was closed on January 11, 1945, and became the Lost Hills Airport, a public airport.

See also
 List of airports in Kern County, California
Minter Army Airfield auxiliary fields
California World War II Army Airfields
California during World War II
American Theater (1939–1945)
Military history of the United States during World War II
United States home front during World War II

References

External links 

Airports in Kern County, California